Eurymenae or Eurymenai was an ancient Greek city of Molossis located in the region of Epirus. The city belonged to the Molossian koinon and was inhabited by the Arktanoi tribe. 

Its site is tentatively located near modern Kastritsa.

See also
List of cities in ancient Epirus

References

Sources

Populated places in ancient Epirus
Cities in ancient Epirus
Former populated places in Greece